William Strahan (24 March 1715 – 9 July 1785) was a Scottish printer and publisher, and a politician who sat in the House of Commons between from 1774 to 1784. He was a correspondent and later a good friend of Benjamin Franklin.

Early life
Born in Edinburgh as William Strachan, and educated at the Royal High School, Strahan was the son of George Strachan, an Edinburgh solicitor and grandson of John Strachan, professor of Divinity at the University of Edinburgh. originally apprenticed to an Edinburgh printer but became a Master Printer in London (at which time he changed the spelling of his name). In 1738 he was made a Freeman of the City of London and a freeman of the Stationers' Company. He married Margaret Penelope Elphinstone, daughter of Edinburgh Episcopal Clergyman William Elphnstone, at St Mary Le Bow on 20 July 1738. They had five children, two daughters and three sons, one of whom, Andrew, would succeed him as King's Printer.

Printing to publishing
Diversifying from printing to publishing, Strahan built up a successful business, at one time employing 50 men. He was Samuel Johnson's chief publisher, being entrusted with the printing of Johnson's Dictionary, and also published the works of the philosophers David Hume and Adam Smith, and the historian Edward Gibbon. Prominent 18th Century Freemason William Preston had attended the same school as Strahan in Edinburgh and was employed by Strahan, as an editor, particularly of David Hume's works. From 1770, Strahan was Printer to the King. Strahan was also the printer for the successful London bookseller Andrew Millar, as well as his longtime friend and business partner. Between 1740–65 Strahan moved his London premises four times in the area between St Bride's and the Strand. By 1770 he owned the biggest printing operation in the kingdom, comprising three separate printing businesses in six buildings.

Friendship with Benjamin Franklin
For many years, Strahan attended debates in Parliament and wrote reports of the proceedings that were widely circulated; his paragraphs of political news were frequently printed in The Pennsylvania Gazette, and he became a friend of its owner, Benjamin Franklin. His protégé, David Hall, succeeded Franklin at his print shop in Philadelphia when Franklin retired in 1747. At first he sympathised with the grievances of the American colonists, disapproving of the Stamp Act and publishing arguments in favour of a reconciliation in his London Chronicle. 

However, he later developed a much more hostile attitude, writing to Hume in 1775 "I am entirely for coercive methods with these obstinate madmen." He voted with Parliament, declaring the patriots as "rebels", which prompted Franklin to write him a letter, which he never sent, declaring "You are now my enemy, and i am yours". This hostility also led to Benjamin Franklin ending their friendship, but reconciling after the war.

Strahan and Franklin corresponded about politics and matters involving their printing businesses throughout much of their lives. There are approximately 130 surviving letters between the two men, many of which have been reprinted in The Papers of Benjamin Franklin.

Parliamentary career
In 1774, Strahan purchased a seat as MP for the Wiltshire borough of Malmesbury, sitting as a supporter of Lord North's Tory administration. He represented that constituency until 1780, and then Wootton Bassett from 1780 to 1784, when he stood down because of ill health. He died the following year.

Portrait by Reynolds
The original painting of Strahan by Reynolds is located at the National Portrait Gallery in London where it is part of the permanent collection. The painting was first exhibited in 1783.

See also
 Early American publishers and printers
 List of early American publishers and printers

References

Sources

External links

unsourced article on Electric Scotland website
Letters of David Hume to William Strahan at Online Library of Liberty
Correspondence between William Strahan and David Hall, 1763-1777 at Historical Society of Pennsylvania
 The William Strahan Letters, dating from 1751 to 1777, are available for research use at the Historical Society of Pennsylvania.
Reynolds' portrait of Strahan
Robert Beatson, A Chronological Register of Both Houses of Parliament (London: Longman, Hurst, Res & Orme, 1807) 
 Lewis Namier & John Brooke, The History of Parliament: The House of Commons 1754-1790 (London: HMSO, 1964)

1715 births
1785 deaths
Publishers (people) from Edinburgh
People educated at the Royal High School, Edinburgh
Publishers (people) from London
Members of the Parliament of Great Britain for English constituencies
British MPs 1774–1780
British MPs 1780–1784
Tory MPs (pre-1834)
Politicians from Edinburgh
Colonial American printers